Charles Newbold (1764–1835) was an American blacksmith born in Chesterfield, New Jersey. On June 26, 1797, Newbold received the first patent for a cast-iron plow. However, he was unable to sell his plow because many farmers feared that the iron in it would poison the soil.

On April 1, 1807, inventor David Peacock was issued a patent for a three-piece iron plow (Newbold's plow was cast in one piece). Newbold then sued Peacock for patent infringement and won $1500.

References

External links

1764 births
1835 deaths
18th-century American inventors
American blacksmiths
People from Chesterfield Township, New Jersey
Engineers from New Jersey
American patent holders
Inventors from New Jersey